Muhajir Cultural Day is a popular Muhajir cultural festival. It is celebrated with traditional enthusiasm to highlight the modern Muhajir and Urdu-speaking culture. The day is celebrated all over Karachi and amongst the Muhajir diaspora worldwide population. Muhajirs celebrate this day to demonstrate the peaceful identity of Muhajir culture and acquire the attention of the world towards their rich heritage.

On this jubilation people gather in all Karachi at press clubs, and other places to arrange various activities. Literary (poetic) gatherings, musical concerts, seminars, lecture programs and rallies.

All political, social and religious organizations of Karachi, besides the Team Muhajir Day and administrations of various schools, colleges and universities, organize a variety of events including seminars, debates, drama and theatric performances, tableaus and literary sittings to mark this annual festivity. Muhajir culture, history and heritage are highlighted at the events.

Background 

The Muhajir Culture is a considerably modern culture and is a blend of Uttar Pardesh, Bengali, Delhi, Hyderabadi and Bihari cultures.

History

2020 
A rally, held under the banner of Nojawanan-e-Karachi, a youth group, started from Karimabad and culminated at the Mazar-e-Quaid.

2021 
Rallies were held in different parts of the city, with a large number of people, mostly youngsters. A rally was held from Karimabad to the mausoleum of Quaide Azam under the auspices of Nojawan e Muhajir. The rally was led by organizers Zohaib Azam, Barrister Hassan Khan, Umair Maqsoodi, Zohaib Khan, Shujat Qazi, Faiz Ali Khan, Fahad Premier. Rally participants were dressed according to the occasion of Muhajir Day. Fashionably attired in kurta, pyjama and brightly-coloured waistcoats, most rally participants were riding motorbikes while several were using four-wheelers and other modes of transport to reach their destination. A hashtag of ‘Muhajir culture day’ was trending on social media since the morning of 24 December 2021.

2022 
2022 muhajir cultural day was organized by Central organizer Zohaib Azam of the Central Cabinet of Muhajir Youth. In Karachi, the main rally, organised by Naujawanan-i-Muhajir, was taken out from Karimabad and Muttahida Qaumi Movement-Pakistan also organised a rally that culminated at Numaish traffic intersection. It was heavily posted on social media.

References

Festivals in Pakistan
Muhajir people
Muhajir communities
Cultural assimilation